Brownstown Township may refer to:

 Brownstown Township, Jackson County, Indiana
 Brownstown Township, Michigan

Township name disambiguation pages